Patrick McGuinness (born 1968) is a British poet and writer.

 Patrick McGuinness may also refer to:

People
 Paddy McGuinness (born 1973), English comedian
 Paddy McGuinness (civil servant) (born 1963), British civil servant
 Paddy McGuinness (footballer) (1878–1918), Australian rules footballer
 Padraic McGuinness (1938–2008), Australian journalist

Other uses
 Patrick McGuinness Three-Decker, a historic building in Worcester, Massachusetts, US

See also
 Patrick Guinness (born 1956), Irish author